Gadarpur Legislative Assembly constituency is one of the seventy electoral Uttarakhand Legislative Assembly constituencies of Uttarakhand state in India. It includes Gadarpur area of Udham Singh Nagar District.

Gadarpur Legislative Assembly constituency is a part of Nainital-Udhamsingh Nagar (Lok Sabha constituency).

Election results

2022

See also
 Pantnagar–Gadarpur (Uttarakhand Assembly constituency)

References

External links
  

Udham Singh Nagar district
Assembly constituencies of Uttarakhand
2012 establishments in Uttarakhand
Constituencies established in 2012
Gadarpur